The  was a major smallpox epidemic that afflicted much of Japan. Killing approximately one third (around 1 million individuals) of the entire Japanese population, the epidemic had significant social, economic, and religious repercussions throughout the country.

Origins

A few decades prior to the outbreak, Japanese court officials had adopted the Chinese policy of reporting disease outbreaks among the general population. This recording practice greatly facilitated the identification of smallpox as the disease that afflicted Japan during the years 735–737.

Increased contact and trade between Japan and the Asian mainland, directly and through Korea, had led to more frequent and serious outbreaks of infectious diseases, including smallpox.  The smallpox epidemic of 735–737  was recorded as having taken hold around August 735 in the city of Dazaifu, Fukuoka in northern Kyushu. The infection had ostensibly been carried by a shipwrecked Japanese fisherman who had contracted the illness after being stranded on the Korean peninsula. The disease spread rapidly throughout northern Kyushu that year, and persisted into the next year. By 736, many land tenants in Kyushu were either dying or forsaking their crops, leading to poor agricultural yields and ultimately famine.

Also in the year 736, a group of Japanese governmental officials passed through northern Kyushu while the epidemic was intensifying. As members of the party sickened and died, the group abandoned its intended mission to the Korean peninsula. Returning to the capital with smallpox, the officials helped spread the disease to eastern Japan and Nara.  The disease continued to ravage Japan in 737.  One manifestation of the pandemic's great impact was that by August of 737, a tax exemption had been extended to all of Japan.

Based on fiscal reports, adult mortality for the smallpox epidemic of 735–737 has been estimated at 25–35% of Japan's entire population, with some areas experiencing much higher rates.  All levels of society were affected.  Many court nobles perished due to smallpox in 737, including all four brothers of the politically powerful Fujiwara clan: Fujiwara no Muchimaro (680–737), Fujiwara no Fusasaki (681–737), Fujiwara no Umakai (694–737), and Fujiwara no Maro (695–737).  Their sudden departure from the royal court allowed for the ascension of noted rival Tachibana no Moroe to a high official position in the court of Emperor Shōmu.

The epidemic not only killed a large segment of the population, it triggered significant dislocation, migration, and imbalance of labor throughout Japan. Highly affected were construction and farming, especially rice cultivation.

Aftermath

In addition to the granting of tax waivers, Japan's nobles took other unprecedented actions in response to the effects of the epidemic to help stem widespread population migration and to reinvigorate the farming communities.  For example, several years after the smallpox epidemic had run its course, the Japanese leaders attempted to stimulate agricultural productivity by offering private land ownership to those willing to work farmland.

Also around this time Emperor Shōmu, who felt personally responsible for the tragedy, greatly increased the official support of Buddhism by commissioning the construction of the grand temple Tōdai-ji and its Daibutsu. He also provided significant financial support for the construction of other provincial temples (the ), statues, and related religious structures throughout the country.  The cost to cast the Daibutsu alone has been said to have nearly bankrupted the country.

Over the next several centuries, Japan continued to experience smallpox epidemics.  But by the early part of the 2nd millennium, smallpox had become endemic to the Japanese population and thus less devastating during outbreaks.

See also
 Smallpox demon

References

8th century in Japan
Nara period
Smallpox epidemics
Disease outbreaks in Japan
8th-century disasters